This is a list of mountains of the Swiss canton of St. Gallen. The canton of St. Gallen is partially located in the Alps and is one of the nine cantons having summits over 3,000 metres. Topographically, the two most important summits of the canton are those of the Ringelspitz (most elevated and isolated) and the Säntis (most prominent).

This list only includes significant summits with a topographic prominence of at least . There are over 50 such summits in the canton of St. Gallen and they are mostly found in its southern districts. All mountain heights and prominences on the list are from the largest-scale maps available.

List

References

St. Gallen